Daniel Tata (born on August 9, 1990) is an Indonesian footballer that currently plays for PS Barito Putera in the Indonesia Super League.

Club career statistics

References

External links

1990 births
Living people
Indonesian footballers
Papuan sportspeople
Liga 1 (Indonesia) players
Persipura Jayapura players
Association football defenders
Association football midfielders